Atua-anua is a mother goddess in the mythology of Easter Island.

References 
 Robert D. Craig: Dictionary of Polynesian Mythology, 1989

Rapa Nui goddesses
Mother goddesses